Kyaukse Township is a township of Kyaukse District in the Mandalay Region of Burma. It makes up the area including the town of Kyaukse. Yeywa Dam is located there.

Villages
 
  Chaungzon
  Dawe
  Dwehla
  Hamyinbo
  Hele
  Hele North
  Hele South
  Hin-ngu
  Hngetkadaung
  Indaing
  Inyaung
  Kade
  Kalagyaung
  Kale
  Kaungdin
  Kontha
  Kyaukpya
  Kyauksauk
  Kyauksaukkale
  Kyauksaukkon
  Kyaukse
  Kyaungbangon
  Kyaungywa
  Kyetsha
  Kyetsin
  Letpan
  Letpan
  Magyidan
  Maingban
  Mezebin
  Mezebin
  Mingan
  Minzu
  Mogyogon
  Monbaungywa
  Mwegon
  Myauk Hamyinbo
  Myauk Hin-ngu
  Myauk Monbaungywa
  Myezo
  Myindwin
  Myingondaing
  Nam-hu
  Nanni
  Naungkan
  Nga-o
  Ngedaw
  Nyaungbinzauk
  Nyaungwun
  Ongyaw
  Onletkauk
  Padaungga
  Pahtodaing
  Palambo
  Panan
  Patta
  Pedaw
  Pein
  Peleze
  Pindaleywama
  Ponnyetkyegyi
  Pyaukseikpin
  Pyiban
  Pyidawtha
  Sama
  Sawye
  Shabin
  Shantaungu
  Shanywa
  Shanywagyigon
  Shwele
  Swezon
  Taungbo
  Taungdaw
  Taung Hamyinbo
  Taung Hin-ngu
  Taunghlwe
  Taung Monbaungywa
  Tawdwin
  Tazo
  Thagaya
  Thanywa
  Thanywa Anauk
  Thanywa Ashe
  Thazi
  Thinbok
  Thindaung
  Thindaungywashe
  Thodan
  Uyingyi
  Yamanywa
  Yanbetlo
  Yebawgale
  Yebawgyi
  Yebyit
  Yegyi
  Yethayauk
  Ywabale
  Ywatha
  Ywathit
  Zale
  Zayitke
  Zibinwun

Townships of Mandalay Region